Foolad Shahr Stadium (Persian: ورزشگاه فولادشهر, Varzeshgāh-e Fulādshahr) is a football stadium in Fooladshahr, Iran. It is the home stadium of Zob Ahan, and was opened in 1998.

The stadium is listed as having a capacity of 15,000.

The Stadium hosted 2007 AFC Champions League Final between Sepahan and Urawa Red Diamonds.

References

External links 
 Stadium photo at panoramio.com

Football venues in Iran
Buildings and structures in Isfahan Province
Sport in Isfahan Province